Laitham Vandermeer (born 3 February 1999) is an Australian rules footballer, who plays for the Western Bulldogs in the Australian Football League (AFL). He was recruited by the Western Bulldogs with the 37th draft pick in the 2018 AFL draft.

Early Football
Vandermeer participated in the Auskick program at Mooroopna, Victoria

Vandermeer played for the Murray Bushrangers for 3 seasons and Vic Country in the AFL Under 18 Championships for 1 season. Prior he played with Mooroopna Football Club and his school side at Xavier College, with future teammate Bailey Smith.

AFL career

2020 season: Debut
Vandermeer played 15 games for the Bulldogs' Victorian Football League (VFL) side in 2019, before breaking into the Australian Football League (AFL) team in 2020. Vandermeer debuted in the Bulldogs' loss to the St Kilda Saints in the second round of the 2020 AFL season. Vandermeer kicked his first goal on his debut, as well as collecting 10 disposals, 3 marks and 2 tackles. Vandermeer suffered a hamstring injury in the Bulldogs' 11 point loss to the Geelong Football Club in the 14th round of the 2020 AFL season, and was ruled out for the rest of the home and away season. Vandermeer won the Western Bulldogs Chris Grant Best First Year Player award, after playing 12 games in the 2020 AFL season and kicking 9 goals.

2021 season

Statistics
 Statistics are correct to round 2, 2021

|-
| scope="row" style="text-align:center" | 2019
|  || 23 || 0 || — || — || — || — || — || — || — || — || — || — || — || — || — || —
|- style="background-color: #EAEAEA"
! scope="row" style="text-align:center" | 2020
|style="text-align:center;"|
| 23 || 12 || 9 || 9 || 72 || 45 || 117 || 31 || 26 || 0.8 || 0.8 || 6.0 || 3.8 || 9.8 || 2.6 || 2.2
|-
| scope="row" text-align:center | 2021
| 
| 23 || 2 || 3 || 2 || 10 || 14 || 24 || 4 || 6 || 1.5 || 1.0 || 5.0 || 7.0 || 12.0 || 2.0 || 3.0
|- style="background:#EAEAEA; font-weight:bold; width:2em"
| scope="row" text-align:center class="sortbottom" colspan=3 | Career
| 14
| 12
| 11
| 82
| 59
| 141
| 35
| 32
| 0.9
| 0.8
| 5.9
| 4.2
| 10.1
| 2.5
| 2.3
|}

Honours & Achievements
 Chris Grant Best First Year Player: 2020

References

External links

1999 births
Living people
Western Bulldogs players
Australian rules footballers from Melbourne
Murray Bushrangers players
People educated at Xavier College